Alan Michael Schwarzwalder (October 30, 1943 – June 24, 2013) was a member of the Ohio Senate, serving the 16th district which encompassed the western portions of Columbus, Ohio. He was a member of the Democratic Party.

Schwarzwalder was elected to the Ohio Senate in 1976 after defeating incumbent Donald L. Woodland in the Democratic primary. He won re-election in 1980 against Republican Fred L. Morrison. He lost his seat in 1984 to Republican Eugene J. Watts.

References

Democratic Party Ohio state senators
1943 births
2013 deaths
Politicians from San Diego